Pasquale Fazio (born 10 June 1989) is an Italian footballer who plays as a right back for  club Catanzaro.

Career
On 10 July 2019, he signed with Juve Stabia.

On 16 September 2020 he joined Catanzaro on a 2-year contract.

Honours
Ternana
 Lega Pro Prima Divisione: 2011–12 (Group A)

References

External links

1989 births
Living people
Sportspeople from Messina
Footballers from Sicily
Italian footballers
Association football defenders
Serie B players
Serie C players
Lega Pro Seconda Divisione players
S.S. Fidelis Andria 1928 players
Ternana Calcio players
Trapani Calcio players
S.S. Juve Stabia players
U.S. Catanzaro 1929 players